Gustavo Barros Schelotto (born 4 May 1973) is an Argentine former footballer who played as a midfielder. He was the assistant manager of LA Galaxy.

Playing career
Born in La Plata, Barros Schelotto came through the youth system at Club de Gimnasia y Esgrima La Plata with his twin brother Guillermo. Gustavo made his Primera debut against Club Atlético Vélez Sársfield on 4 October 1992. They helped the team to win the Copa Centenario (the AFA Centenary Cup) in 1993.

In 1996, Guillermo was signed by Argentine giants Boca Juniors and Gustavo followed him there in 1997. He was part of 3 national leagues winning squads and helped the team to win the 2000 Libertadores Cup and the Copa Intercontinental later that year. Barros Schelotto played 65 games for Boca in all competitions, scoring 6 goals.

In January 2001, Barros Schelotto had a small La Liga stint, joining Spanish side Villarreal CF  before returning to Argentina to join Racing Club de Avellaneda where he won the Apertura 2001. He then went on to play for Rosario Central before returning to Gimnasia de La Plata.

In 2005 Barros Schelotto joined Peruvian outfit Alianza Lima, and in 2006 moved to Puerto Rico Islanders of the USL First Division in the United States where he played 23 games and scored 3 goals.

Coaching career
In March 2009, Barros Schelotto became the assistant manager of Gregorio Pérez at Club Olimpia. He left the position together with Pérez in July. Pérez and Barros Schelotto continued together the next year, where they joined Club Libertad in April 2010 before leaving in July 2011. In September 2011 they joined Peñarol still with Barros Schelotto as Pérez' assistant.

In July 2012, Barros Schelotto was appointed as the assistant manager of Club Atlético Lanús in Argentine alongside his twin brother Guillermo Barros Schelotto who became the manager. The two brothers finished the 2015 season before leaving to seek a fresh challenge elsewhere. In March 2016, the two twin brothers joined Boca Juniors, with Guillermo as the manager and Gustavo as the assistant manager. They left the club again at the end of the 2018 season.

On 9 January 2019, Gustavo and his twin brother joined LA Galaxy, again with Gustavo as the assistant manager under Guillermo. They were relieved of their duties on October 29, 2020 due to Galaxy’s poor performance near the ladder part of the season.

Personal life
Barros Schelotto is the brother of Guillermo Barros Schelotto. Their father, Hugo Barros Schelotto, was one of Gimnasia y Esgrima's presidents in the 1980s, while his nephews Juan, Salvador & Tomás Cataldi and Bautista Barros Schelotto are footballers.

Honours
 Gimnasia de La Plata
Centenary Cup: 1993

 Boca Juniors
Argentine League: Apertura 1998, Clausura 1999, Apertura 2000
Copa Libertadores: 2000
Intercontinental Cup: 2000

 Racing Club
Argentine League: Apertura 2001

References

External links

Gustavo Barros Schelotto at BDFA.com.ar 

1973 births
Living people
Club Alianza Lima footballers
Argentine expatriate footballers
Argentine expatriate sportspeople in Spain
Argentine expatriate sportspeople in Puerto Rico
Argentine footballers
Boca Juniors footballers
Expatriate footballers in Peru
Expatriate footballers in Puerto Rico
Club de Gimnasia y Esgrima La Plata footballers
Argentine Primera División players
La Liga players
Footballers from La Plata
Puerto Rico Islanders players
Racing Club de Avellaneda footballers
Rosario Central footballers
Argentine twins
Unión de Santa Fe footballers
USL First Division players
Villarreal CF players
Twin sportspeople
Association football midfielders
Barros Schelotto/Cataldi family